Euphorbia mesembryanthemifolia, commonly called seaside spurge, is a species of flowering plant in the spurge family (Euphorbiaceae). It is native to the Western Hemisphere, where it is found in coastal areas from Florida in the United States south to Colombia and Venezuela, as well as in Bermuda and the Caribbean. Its natural habitat is on beaches and rocky shores.

Euphorbia mesembryanthemifolia is an erect or sprawling subshrub with opposite, glaucous leaves. It flowers year-round.

References

mesembryanthemifolia
Flora of North America